Ath is a city in Belgium.

The acronym or initials ATH may also refer to:

 Athens International Airport, Greece, IATA code
 Atherstone railway station, UK, National Rail code
 Around the Horn, an ESPN Television Show
 Absolute threshold of hearing
 ATH (interbank network), Puerto Rico and the Caribbean
 A Toda Hora, a Colombian interbank network
 The Hayes command set for modems "hang up" command
 University of Bielsko-Biała (Polish:  or "ATH" in its logo and web site)
 Athabaskan languages (ISO 639-2 and ISO 639-5 codes)

See also

Anth (disambiguation)